USS Tutuila (PR-4) was a gunboat in the service of the United States Navy from 1928, until her transfer to China, under lend-lease in 1942.

Construction
Tutuila was laid down as gunboat PG-44 on 17 October 1926, at the Kiangnan Dockyard and Engineering Works in Shanghai, China; launched on 14 June 1927, sponsored by Miss Beverly Pollard; and commissioned on 2 March 1928.

Service history

Yangtze Patrol, 1928-1937
Assigned to the Yangtze Patrol (YangPat) and redesignated river gunboat PR-4 on 16 June 1928, Tutuila cruised on shakedown up the Yangtze River from Shanghai to Yichang, where she joined her sister ship Guam in mid-July. Convoying river steamers through the upper reaches of the Yangtze on her first passage through the scenic gorges, she flew the flag of Rear Admiral Yates Stirling, Jr., Commander, Yangtze Patrol (ComYangPat). Tutuilas shallow draft enabled her to traverse the treacherous rapids of the gorges with ease, so that the fluctuating water levels did not hinder her year-round access to the upper stretch of the Yangtze. Her duty with YangPat offered excitement and variety: conducting roving armed patrols; convoying merchantmen; providing armed guards for American flag steamers; and "showing the flag" to protect American lives and property in a land where civil strife and warfare had been a way of life for centuries.

One incident which called for a mixture of diplomacy and force came in 1929, when Lt. Cdr. S. D. Truesdell was in command of the gunboat. He called on the Chinese warlord from whose territory some rifle shots had come. During a discussion of the incident, the general explained that his men were merely "country boys, who meant no harm". Truesdell replied that he, too, had some "country boys" among his own crew. He noted that he had found them tinkering with the after 3-inch gun, pointing it at the general's conspicuous white headquarters as they practiced their range-finding. Truesdell's rejoinder bore immediate fruit; the sniper fire ceased.

Sino-Japanese War, 1937-1941
In 1937, the complexion of life for the Yangtze gunboats changed. The undeclared Second Sino-Japanese War began in July and spread to the Yangtze valley in August–September. On 3 August 1938, Tutuila followed  up the river to Chungking, as the YangPat flagship carried the American Ambassador—Nelson T. Johnson—to that river port.

Tutuila remained at Chungking as station ship with little hope of relief. Further Japanese operations resulted in the capture of Hankow in October 1938, making river travel below the former Chinese capital city subject to harassment and obstruction by the Japanese Navy. Such conditions resulted in the stranding of Tutuila at Chungking, where she remained through 1941.

On 8 May 1940 Tutuila ran aground and was damaged. She remained stranded until refloated on 13 May then repaired and returned to service.

After the fall of Hankow, the Chinese moved their capital up river to Tutuilas station, Chungking. Japanese forces thus stepped up the intensity of their attacks on that city, and air raids were common occurrences during the spring, summer, and fall. Only winter bad weather prevented the Japanese from year-round heavy raids. Moored at Lungmenhao Lagoon, Tutuila bore a charmed life until 31 July 1941, when Japanese bombs landed close aboard, holing the ship at her waterline and destroying the ship's motor skimmer with its outboard motor.

By late 1941, as the situation in the Far East worsened, four gunboats remained with YangPat and one in the South China Patrol. Admiral Hart's reduction of naval forces in Chinese waters cut this number to two. Wake remained at Shanghai as station ship; Tutuila, beyond hope of escape, remained marooned at Chungking.  departed Hong Kong at approximately the same time and arrived in the Philippines shortly after hostilities commenced.

World War II, 1941-1942
Shortly after his arrival in Manila, RAdm. Glassford deactivated the Yangtze Patrol on 6 December 1941. Within a few days, Japanese air attacks had devastated Pearl Harbor; and hostilities were underway with a rapidity which caught Wake unawares at Shanghai, where she was captured. For Tutuila, however, this news only heightened the anxiety.

Her residual complement of two officers and 22 enlisted men was ordered to depart from Chungking without their ship. She was then taken under the jurisdiction of the Naval Attaché attached to the American Embassy, Chungking. She was decommissioned on 18 January 1942, the same day Tutuilas crew flew out of the city.

Republic of China Navy, 1942-1949
The attaché delivered the ship to an authorized representative of the Republic of China on 16 February 1942. Then, under terms of lend-lease, the U.S. Navy leased the gunboat to China on 19 March, her name becoming Mei Yuan, which can be translated as "of American origin". The name Tutuila was struck from the U.S. Naval Vessel Register on 26 March.

The ship was permanently transferred to the Chinese government on 17 February 1948. She served the Nationalist Navy until near the end of the Civil War which ravaged China after World War II. As Communist forces advanced upon Shanghai, the Nationalists abandoned and scuttled Mei Yuan to prevent her capture. Her subsequent fate is unknown.

References

External links
 NavSource Online: Gunboat Photo Archive: USS Tutuila (PR 4), ex-PG-44

Gunboats of the United States Navy
Ships built in China
1927 ships
World War II patrol vessels of the United States
Ships transferred from the United States Navy to the Republic of China Navy
Patrol vessels of the Republic of China Navy
Riverine warfare
Maritime incidents in May 1940